The Jersey Derby is a $60,000 American Thoroughbred horse race for three-year-olds held annually in late July/early August at Monmouth Park Racetrack in Oceanport, New Jersey. Since 1993, it has been raced on grass at a distance of  miles.

A Jersey Derby was run on June 7, 1864, at a racetrack in Paterson, New Jersey. The one-time event was won by Robert A. Alexander's colt Norfolk. When the Garden State Park Racetrack opened in 1942, it created the Jersey Handicap, which was renamed the Jersey Stakes in 1948. Since 1960, it has been known as the Jersey Derby.

In the spring of 1977, a fire destroyed Garden State Park, and the race was shifted to the Atlantic City Race Course, where it was run that year. The race resumed in 1981 at the Atlantic City track and was raced there for four years until it returned to Garden State Park in 1985, where it remained through 1998.

Now a Listed race, at one time the Jersey Derby was one of the premier events on the American summer racing calendar. It  counts among its winners greats such as 1948's U.S. Triple Crown champion, Citation, and nine other American Classic winners, plus two-time Breeders' Cup Mile winner Da Hoss. In 1998, Who Did It and Run became the first filly to ever win the Jersey Derby. She did it in the final year the race was held at Garden State Park before it moved to its present location at Monmouth Park.

Since inception in 1942, the race has been contested at various distances:
 1 mile: 2021 to present 
  miles : 1993 to 2020 
  miles : 1942–1947, 1953–1984, 1991–1992
  miles : 1948–1952, 1985–1990

The turf race had to be moved to the dirt track for the 2001, 2003, and 2021 editions.

Records
Speed  record:
1:40.80 – Swamp ( mile on turf, 1999)
1:34.93 - Fuerteventura (1 mile on turf, 2022) 

Most wins by a jockey:
 3 – Craig Perret :  (1981, 1988, 1989)
 3 – Julie Krone : (1993, 1995, 1996)
 3 - Joe Bravo : (2009, 2012, 2019)

Winners

† In 1967, Dr. Fager came first but was disqualified for interference.

References
The Jersey Derby history and details at Monmouth Park

Ungraded stakes races in the United States
Turf races in the United States
Flat horse races for three-year-olds
Monmouth Park Racetrack
Atlantic City Race Course
Garden State Park Racetrack
Recurring sporting events established in 1942
1942 establishments in New Jersey